Giovanna Reynaud  (born July 16, 1997) is a Mexican actress and model, known for her portrayals of Gala in the Disney XD original series Jungle Nest (2016) and Emilia in the Disney Channel Argentinian telenovela Soy Luna (2017–2018).

Life and career 
She studied theater at the Broadway Teachers Workshop in New York and specialized in acting, singing, modeling, jazz, and hip hop at the Institute of Theatrical Art Training of Mexico. Since then, she has played various roles in children's plays and musicals in her native Mexico, among which stand out Tangled as Rapunzel, Tarzan as Jane, and The Princess and the Toad as Charlotte. In addition, she made commercials for television and participated in music videos of well-known Mexican bands.

In 2016, she travelled to Argentina to participate in the Disney XD LA series Jungle Nest, her debut on television. Reynaud portrayed the character of Gala, a vain girl. In 2017, she joined Season 2 of Soy Luna as Emilia in a recurring role. She was upgraded to a series regular for Season 3 and participated in the farewell tour Soy Luna en Vivo.

Personal life 
Reynaud has a sister named Ana Sofía. As of July 25, 2018, Reynaud has been dating her Soy Luna co-star Pasquale Di Nuzzo. On June 20, 2020, they announced they were engaged. They were married at La Cima del Copal in Jalisco, Mexico on August 29, 2020.

Filmography

Awards and nominations

Tours 
 Soy Luna En Vivo (2018)

References 

Living people
1997 births
21st-century Mexican actresses
Actresses from Guadalajara, Jalisco